National Lampoon's Van Wilder is a 2002 American comedy film directed by Walt Becker and written by Brent Goldberg and David T. Wagner.

The film stars Ryan Reynolds as the title character alongside Tara Reid, Kal Penn, and Tim Matheson. The film follows the misadventures of its lead character, Van Wilder, a seventh-year senior who has made it his life goal to help undergrads at Coolidge College succeed in the future.

After an article is written about his legacy by fellow student, Gwen Pearson (played by Reid), Van Wilder's party lifestyle is brought to light. This attracts the attention of Van's father, played by Matheson, who cuts off his tuition. Van Wilder gets stuck in the middle of a love triangle between Gwen and her mean-spirited boyfriend, Richard "Dick" Bagg while struggling to graduate. Van tries various schemes to earn enough money to pay his tuition and graduate, with help from Gwen and the rest of the student body, except a couple of sinister enemies who attempt to sabotage his efforts.

Despite receiving mostly negative reviews from critics, the film is praised by audiences. The film grossed $21,305,259 in the domestic box office; $16,970,224 in the international box office; and $38,275,483 worldwide overall, thus making it a box-office success.

A sequel, Van Wilder: The Rise of Taj, was released on December 1, 2006. A prequel, Van Wilder: Freshman Year, was released straight-to-DVD on July 14, 2009.

Plot
Vance "Van" Wilder is a confident and sardonic seventh-year senior at Coolidge College who spends his days driving around campus in his customized golf cart, posing nude for figure drawing classes, and organizing soirees and fundraisers for his peers. Upon learning that his son is still in school, his father severs financial support. Van seeks a payment extension from the registrar, Deloris Haver. After having sex with her, Deloris hands him the paperwork for an extension, which Van realizes he only needed to ask for in the first place.

After a couple of attempts to get money fast, Van is approached by the Lambda Omega Omega fraternity, offering to pay him a thousand dollars to throw them a blowout party to boost their popularity. Gwen Pearson, a reporter for the school paper, writes a story crediting Van as the host of the party. Van, who normally refuses to do interviews for the paper, realizes the article can be the "cash cow" he needs to stay in school and agrees to sit down with Gwen for a follow-up piece.

Gwen's boyfriend, Richard "Dick" Bagg, is a pre-medical student and the president of his fraternity Delta Iota Kappa, as well as of the student government. As he learns of Gwen's work with Van, suspecting a growing bond between them, he moves to sabotage their prospective romance. Van and Richard exchange escalating pranks.

Gwen learns that Van stopped attending classes years ago, 18 units short of graduation. Angry that she dug into such personal details, Van disassociates himself from Gwen, taking a contemplative look at his life.

Richard arranges to sabotage Van's latest party with Jeannie, a member of a sister sorority, by smuggling underaged children in and getting them drunk, then calling campus police to the scene. Van is arrested for providing alcohol to minors and faces expulsion from Coolidge. He prepares to leave the college until his friend Taj inspires him to fight the charges.

Van throws himself at the mercy of the court, asking that rather than expelling him, they force him to graduate; he offers to complete his remaining units before the semester ends, earning a degree in leisure studies. The academic board votes 3–2 in favor of Van's reinstatement; Professor McDougal's was the decisive vote for reinstatement, surprisingly. Van begins studying for the finals, which will be held in six days.

Outside the court, Jeannie reveals Richard's plot to Gwen, as well as his infidelity. Angered by this, Gwen pretends to forgive Richard then spikes his protein shake with a powerful laxative just before his entrance exam to Northwestern Medical School. While taking the exam, Richard begins to have uncontrollable flatulence and hurries down the line with his exam. Richard then is intercepted by his future alumni intended to interview him for his entrance. Unable to hold it in any longer, Richard strips off his pants and proceeds to defecate violently in a wastebasket in front of the medical doctors, much to their horror.

Van uses the entire exam period for his last final with his least favorite professor, Prof. McDougal, who later delivers the news to Van that he passed. McDougal explains he had been so hard on him all those years because he believed Van was not living up to his potential, not because Van had also hooked up with McDougal's daughter freshmen year. Gwen finishes her article on Van for the graduation issue revealing his many contributions to the students and staff of Coolidge in the last seven years, his superhuman accomplishment of doing a semester's worth of studying in just six days, and Richard's plot to have Van expelled; Richard is seen reading Gwen's article, his medical school dreams are ruined and his reputation is destroyed.

The university celebrates Van's graduation with a wild party held in his honor. His father, having read Gwen's article, admits he was wrong and expresses his pride in Van's success. Gwen arrives, lovingly reunites with Van.

Cast

Soundtrack
The soundtrack album was released on March 26, 2002. It omits the song "Hello" by Sugarbomb, "Authority Song" by Jimmy Eat World, and "Stuck in America" by Sugarcult. Other artists with songs omitted from the soundtrack included Atomic Kitten, Michelle Branch, Sprung Monkey, Bird 3, Spymob, Mint Royale, and Tahiti 80.

 "Roll On" - The Living End (Chris Cheney)
 "Bleed American" - Jimmy Eat World (Jimmy Eat World)
 "Hit the Ground" - 6gig (6gig)
 "Bouncing Off the Walls" - Sugarcult (Sugarcult)
 "I'm a Fool" - American Hi-Fi (Stacy Jones)
 "Girl On the Roof" - David Mead
 "Things Are Getting Better" - N*E*R*D (Chad Hugo, Pharrell)
 "Okay" - Swirl 360 (Denny & Kenny Scott, Tonio K)
 "Blind Spot" - Transmatic (Transmatic)
 "Makes No Difference" - Sum 41 (Sum 41)
 "At Auntie Tom's" - Fuzz Townshend (Fuzz Townshend, Matt Machin, Roger Charlery)
 "Little Man (2002 Mix)" - Sia (Sia Furler, Sam Frank)
 "Start Over" - Abandoned Pools (Tommy Walter, Pete Pagonis)
 "You Get Me" - Michelle Branch (Michelle Branch)

Release

Box office
Van Wilder opened with $7,302,913, ranking number 6 in the domestic box office. It grossed $21,305,259 domestically with $16,970,224 internationally for a worldwide total of $38,275,483. Based on a $5 million budget, the film was a box office success.

Critical reception
The film received negative reviews from critics. Rotten Tomatoes gives the film a score of 18% based on 98 reviews, with an average rating of 3.45/10. The website's critical consensus describes the film as being "a derivative gross-out comedy that's short on laughs". On Metacritic, the film has a 26 out of 100 score based on 24 critics, indicating "generally unfavorable reviews". Audiences surveyed by CinemaScore gave the film a grade "C+" on scale of A to F.

Home media
Van Wilder was released via VHS and DVD by Artisan Entertainment on August 20, 2002. The DVD was presented in rated and unrated editions, both editions containing a cropped full-frame transfer, and a widescreen version in its original 1.85:1 aspect ratio. The two-disc set also contained deleted scenes, outtakes, three Burly Bear TV specials, a Comedy Central: Reel Comedy TV special, "Bouncing Off the Walls" music video performed by Sugarcult, trailers, and other promotional material like television ads and poster art.

On November 28, 2006, in a way of promoting the sequel to Van Wilder, The Rise of Taj, Lions Gate Home Entertainment released a 2-disc special edition DVD with new bonus features including a "Drunken Idiot Kommentary" (featuring National Lampoon editors Steven Brykman and Mason Brown), behind-the-scenes footage, and interviews with the cast and crew.

The film was also released on Blu-ray on August 21, 2007, which had almost the same features as the 2-disc special edition DVD. Also included (and exclusive to the Blu-ray edition) is the "Blu-Book Exam", an interactive game that focuses on Van Wilder trivia questions, plus a series of "Blu-line" options including a pop-up film-progression menu that allows the viewer to set bookmarks and skip around the feature film. The film was released on 4K UHD Blu-Ray on August 14, 2018.

Sequel

A sequel, entitled The Rise of Taj, followed this, centering on the character of Taj Mahal Badalandabad. The film was released theatrically in 2006 by Metro-Goldwyn-Mayer and produced by Bauer Martinez.

Prequel

A direct-to-DVD prequel to this film was also released in 2009 by Paramount Pictures under its Paramount Famous Productions label, entitled Freshman Year; the film follows Van as he deals with his freshman year of college.

References

External links
 
 

2002 comedy films
2002 directorial debut films
2002 films
2002 independent films
2000s sex comedy films
2000s teen comedy films
American coming-of-age films
American independent films
American sex comedy films
American teen comedy films
Artisan Entertainment films
2000s English-language films
Films about fraternities and sororities
Films directed by Walt Becker
Films shot in Los Angeles
Films shot in Vancouver
German comedy films
English-language German films
Lionsgate films
National Lampoon films
Teen sex comedy films
2000s American films
2000s German films